Marie-Jeanne-Amélie Le Francais de Lalande, born Marie-Jeanne Harlay (1768 – 8 November 1832), was a French astronomer and mathematician.

Biography
Lalande married her father's young cousin, also an astronomer, Michel Lefrançois de Lalande (1776-1839) in 1788. She was also the niece of the astronomer and writer Jérôme Lalande, who was said to have valued Lalande for her mathematical disposition.

Her father taught the young couple calculation and observation methods in astronomy.

She worked closely alongside her father and contributed to many of his publications.

Her reputation as a scientific woman was attested by an anecdote related to Carl Friedrich Gauss: In 1806, during a military campaign in Prussia, he declared he knew but one French woman that worked in Science, Madame Le François de Lalande"

She died in 1832 at the age of 64.  Her daughter, Caroline was named after Caroline Herschel, her birth date, 20 January 1790 being the first day a Comet discovered by Herschel was visible from Paris.  Her son was named after Isaac Newton.

Work
She calculated the Tables horaires de marine, which was published in her father's Abrégé de navigation historique théorique et pratique avec tables horaires (1793). These calculations earned her father one of the medals of the Lycée des Arts for distinguished scholars and artists.

Her work was also published in her father's annual almanac from 1794 to 1806.

In 1799, she established a catalog of 10,000 stars.

In 1791, her expertise in astronomy earned her the privilege of guiding the son of famous astronomer Jean Dominique Cassini, through his first observation at the College de France.

She also collaborated on the writing of L'Histoire céleste française written by Lalande and published in 1801. The work indicated the position of 50,000 stars.

Legacy
The multi-ring impact crater, de Lalande (crater), on Venus was named after her.

References

Further reading

1760 births
18th-century French astronomers
1832 deaths
Women astronomers
Place of birth missing
18th-century French women scientists
19th-century French women scientists
19th-century French astronomers